Quality Street Music is the fourth studio album by American hip hop disc jockey DJ Drama. It was released on October 2, 2012, by Entertainment One Music, Aphilliates Music Group, Embassy Entertainment and Powerhouse Productions. The album features guest appearances from Kendrick Lamar, Childish Gambino, T-Pain, Fabolous, Jeezy, Drake, Future, Nipsey Hussle, Wiz Khalifa, T.I., Ludacris, 2 Chainz, B.o.B., Kid Ink, Jeremih, Meek Mill, Waka Flocka Flame, Tyler, the Creator, among others.

Singles
The album's lead single, "We in This Bitch" was released for digital download on February 29, 2012. The song features guest vocals from American hip hop recording artists Future, Jeezy, T.I., Ludacris, with production by Kane Beatz and JMIKE. The song peaking at number 68 on the US Billboard Hot R&B/Hip-Hop Songs. The music video was released on May 8, 2012, and it was directed by Benny Boom.

The album's second single, "My Moment" was released on June 29, 2012, via iTunes. The song features guest vocals from hip hop recording artists 2 Chainz and Meek Mill, along with an American R&B singer Jeremih, with the production on this track was handled and provided by T-Minus. The song peaking at number 23 on the US Hot R&B/Hip-Hop Songs chart, number 16 on the Rap Songs, and number 89 on the Hot 100. It has become DJ Drama's most successful single to date. The music video was shot at OVO Fest, in Toronto, on August 6, 2012. DJ Drama gathered the song's featured artists and also released behind-the-scenes pictures of the video shoot via his Instagram account. The music video premiered on MTV Jams on September 9, 2012.

The album's third single was this second version of "We in This Bitch", which was called "We in This Bitch 1.5", which also features guest vocals from southern rapper Future with his new verse, and Canadian hip hop recording artist Drake. It was released on May 11, 2012, however, it later came out as a digital download on September 4, 2012.

The album's fourth single, "Never Die" was released on September 15, 2012. The song features guest vocals from American hip hop recording artists Jeezy, Jadakiss and Nipsey Hussle, along with American singer-songwriter Cee Lo Green, with the production that was handled and provided by Cardiak. On that same day, it came out to be included on the final track list for the album.

Other songs
Upon Quality Street Music'''s release, "So Many Girls" featuring Wale, Tyga and Roscoe Dash, peaking at number 44 on the US Hot R&B/Hip-Hop Digital Songs. The cover for the song was released on October 8. It was released as a single on February 20, 2013, and debuted on the Hot 100 at number 89, becoming one of DJ Drama's most successful singles to date.

"Pledge of Allegiance" featuring Wiz Khalifa, Planet VI and B.o.B., debuted on the US Hot R&B/Hip-Hop Songs chart at number 48 despite never being released as a single.

Commercial performance
The album debuted at number 15 on the US Billboard 200, and at number 3 on the Top R&B/Hip-Hop Albums, selling 25,000 copies on its first week. Quality Street Music is DJ Drama's highest charting album to date. As of February 7, 2013, the album has sold 51,080 copies in the United States.

Track listing

Personnel
Credits for Quality Street Music'' adapted from Allmusic.

 2 Chainz – Featured Artist
 Olubowale Akintimehin	– Composer
 Derek "MixedByAli" Ali – Engineer
 Kori Anders – Engineer
 Ermias Asghedom – Composer
 Bart Simmons – Composer
 Lu Balz – Mixing
 Kirko Bangz – Featured Artist
 Alton Bates – Engineer
 Jahill Beats – Producer
 Birdman – Featured Artist
 B.o.B – Featured Artist
 Boi-1DA – Producer
 Andre Bridges – Engineer
 Christopher Bridges – Composer
 Jack "Suthernfolk" Brown – Engineer
 Thomas Calloway – Composer
 Cardiak – Producer
 Elliot Carter – Engineer
 Childish Gambino – Featured Artist
 Clifford Harris – Composer
 Jeremy Coleman – Composer
 Talia Coles – Wardrobe
 Brian Collins – Composer
 Common – Featured Artist
 Currensy – Featured Artist
 Drake – Featured Artist
 Roscoe Dash – Featured Artist
 Radric Davis – Composer
 D.E.B.O. – Featured Artist
 Hector Delgado – Engineer
 DJ Drama – A&R, Primary Artist
 DJ Mustard – Producer
 Kendrick Duckworth – Composer
 Harold Duncan – Composer
 Tauheed Epps – Composer
 Fabolous – Featured Artist
 Jeremy Felton – Composer
 Seth Firkins – Engineer
 Steve Fischer – Engineer
 Hayden Flack – Assistant
 40 – Engineer
 Shante Scott Franklin – Composer
 Future – Featured Artist
 Ghost – Engineer
 Donald Glover – Composer
 Stephen Glover – Engineer
 Fred the Godson – Featured Artist
 Aubrey Graham – Composer
 Cee Lo Green – Featured Artist
 Remo Green – Composer

 Paul Grosso – Creative Director
 Gucci Mane – Featured Artist
 Cory Gunz – Featured Artist
 Quincy Hanley – Composer
 Kevin Hart – Primary Artist
 Eddie Hernandez – Engineer
 Hit-Boy – Producer
 Remo the Hitmaker – Engineer, producer
 Chauncey Hollis – Composer
 Bradley Home – Engineer
 Nipsey Hussle – Featured Artist
 Jess Jackson – Engineer
 John Jackson – Composer
 Jadakiss – Featured Artist
 Jeffery James – Composer
 Jeffrey James – Producer
 Jay Jenkins – Composer
 Jeremih – Featured Artist
 J-MIKE – Producer
 Daniel Andrew Johnson – Composer
 Ricardo "Stickuhbush" Johnson – Engineer
 Jeffrey Lee Johnson, Jr. – Composer
 Kane Beatz – Producer
 Kid Ink – Featured Artist
 Rob Kinelski – Engineer
 Kendrick Lamar – Featured Artist
 Jeff Lane – Engineer
 Derez Lenard – Composer
 Mack Loggins – Composer
 Ludacris – Featured Artist
 Princeton Lynah – Engineer
 Lonnie Rashid Lynn – Composer
 Juaquin Malphurs – Composer
 Sean Marlowe – Art Direction, Design
 Graham Marsh – Engineer
 Lakeem Mattox – Composer
 Carl McCormick – Composer
 Dijon McFarlane – Composer
 Meek Mill – Featured Artist
 Miguel – Featured Artist
 Mario Mims – Composer
 Leighton Morrison – A&R
 Faheem Najm – Composer
 Scott Naughton – Engineer
 Alec Newell – Engineer
 Michael Ray Nguyen-Stevenson – Composer
 Tyler Okonma – Composer
 Peter Pankey – Composer
 Jason Phillips – Composer
 Miguel Pimentel – Composer
 Planet VI – Featured Artist

 Lloyd Pollite – Composer
 Poobs – Engineer
 Pusha T – Featured Artist
 Angel Ramirez, Jr. – Engineer
 Kirk Randle – Composer
 Kevin Rashad – Engineer
 Toni Ray – Engineer
 William Roberts – Composer
 Rick Ross – Featured Artist
 The Rug – Engineer
 Matthew Samuels – Composer
 Glen Schlick – Mastering
 Schoolboy Q – Featured Artist
 Cody Sciarra – Engineer
 Verse Simmonds – Vocals (Background)
 Bobby Ray Simmons – Composer
 Tyree Simmons – Composer
 Jordan J. Sirhan – Engineer
 C. Smith – Composer
 Kev Spencer – Engineer
 The Streets – Executive Producer
 T-Pain – Featured Artist
 A. Taylor – Composer
 D. Thomas – Composer
 Theron Thomas – Composer
 Timothy Thomas – Composer
 Cameron Thomaz – Composer
 Terrence Thornton – Composer
 T.I. – Featured Artist
 Tm88 – Producer
 T-Minus – Producer
 Travis Porter – Featured Artist
 Orlando Tucker – Composer
 Tyga – Featured Artist
 Tyler, the Creator – Featured Artist
 V12 – Producer
 V12 the Hitman – Producer
 Javier Valverde – Engineer
 Waka Flocka Flame – Featured Artist
 Vic – Wainstein	Engineer
 Wale – Featured Artist
 Summer Walker – A&R
 Finis "KY" White – Engineer, Mixing
 Nayvadius Wilburn – Composer
 Brian Williams – Composer
 Tyler Williams – Composer
 Wiz Khalifa – Featured Artist
 Wizzo – Engineer
 Zache Wolfe – Photography
 Donquez Woods – Composer
 Yo Gotti – Featured Artist
 Young Jeezy – Featured Artist

Charts

Weekly charts

Year-end charts

References

2012 albums
DJ Drama albums
E1 Music albums
Albums produced by Boi-1da
Albums produced by Hit-Boy
Albums produced by J.U.S.T.I.C.E. League
Albums produced by Kane Beatz
Albums produced by T-Minus (record producer)
Albums produced by Jahlil Beats
Albums produced by DJ Mustard
Albums produced by TM88
Albums produced by Cardiak